Don A. Carlos (born March 3, 1944) is a retired American basketball player.

Born in Columbus, Ohio, Carlos played collegiately for the Otterbein College.

He was selected by the Los Angeles Lakers in the 8th round (83rd pick overall) of the 1967 NBA Draft.

He played for the Houston Mavericks (1968–69) in the ABA for 56 games.

External links

Ohio Basketball Hall of Fame profile

1944 births
Living people
American men's basketball players
Basketball players from Columbus, Ohio
Hartford Capitols players
Houston Mavericks players
Los Angeles Lakers draft picks
Otterbein Cardinals men's basketball players
Shooting guards